A rune is a letter in a set of related alphabets. 

Rune or Runes may also refer to:

People 
 Rune (given name), a Scandinavian given name
 Holger Rune (born 2003), Danish tennis player
 Michael Rune, Danish 21st century saxophonist
 Rune Naito, pen name of  pen name of Japanese artist, illustrator, writer and designer Isao Naito (1932–2007)
 Rune RK (born 1979), record producer and DJ from Denmark

Arts and entertainment

Fictional characters
 Hugo Rune, in books by Robert Rankin
 Rune (comics), a Malibu Comics vampire-like villain - see List of Ultraverse characters
 Rune, in the film Jungle Emperor Leo (1997)
 Rune Haako, a Separatist in the prequel era of the Star Wars universe

Films
 Rune (film), a 2006 feature film, the first to premiere on Apple's Video iPod

Games
 Rune (role-playing game), a 2001 pen-and-paper role-playing game
 Rune (video game), a 2000 third-person action video game
 A system of customization for League of Legends (2009)

Music
 Runes, a nickname for Led Zeppelin IV, a 1971 album
 Runes (album), Bury Tomorrow's third album, released in 2014

Other uses
 IF Rune, a sports club in Kungsör, Sweden
 Rune, programming jargon meaning a Unicode code point, represented as a 32-bit integer
 Valkyrie Rune, a version of Honda Gold Wing motorcycles

See also
 Ruin (disambiguation)
 Rouen (disambiguation)